Big Brother China, also referred to as Housemates, Let's Stay Together (Shìyǒuyìqǐzhái), was the Chinese version of the international reality television franchise Big Brother created by producer John de Mol in 1997. The only season of the series known as the Pilot Season was pre-recorded in September 2015 and streamed exclusively online by Youku and Tudou on 21 November 2015. The winner was Tan Xiangjun who won an endorsement contract to be a contestant on the first season worth CNY 10 million. However, the first season was never produced.

Development 
Big Brother China was announced by Endemol and Youku Tudou Inc. on 28 October 2014 in a press release. A new division, Endemol China, was created in Beijing for developing and co-developing formats and promoting Chinese content abroad.

The House used for the series was located outside Mumbai, India where the Indian version, Bigg Boss was filmed but re-decorated for the Chinese edition with Endemol India assisting with the production of the show. Rebecca De Young, who previously served as a producer on the British version for over ten years prior to working on the Chinese adaptation, was named as executive producer. The pilot season was filmed over the course of twelve days from 7 to 19 September 2015 and was streamed twice a week on Wednesdays and Saturdays for six weeks starting on 21 November 2015 and ending with a live final on 6 January 2016.

Format 
The Housemates competed in tasks during their stay inside the House. They were also required to vote to save one of the nominated Housemates from eviction. The nominated Housemate with the fewest save votes was evicted. The winner was decided by a public vote during the live finale.

Housemates

Summary

Nominations table

The live final

Notes

 This housemate was given or won immunity for that round.
: Housemates were required to nominate two housemates for eviction.
: Deng Huanyu and Wang Linyi received immunities from Yang Xiaolou, therefore immune. 
: Liu Sibo and Morpheus received the most nominations from Day 5, the rest of the housemates voted for whom they wanted to save. The housemate with the fewest votes was evicted.
: This round of nominations was decided by a random draw.
: Based on the result of the 'Who is the killer' task, Jiang Chenchen won immunity. Deng Huanyu and Xie Sitong had to select another housemate to nominate. They chose Liu Sibo.
: Day 9 was a double eviction.
: Housemates were nominated on Day 11, but who facing eviction was announced on Day 12 at the Awards ceremony. Because Wang Manyu won the "Best Zhuge Liang" award, so only she had the power to vote in this round, although she was also nominated.
: Live final took place at 8:30 pm on 6 January in Beijing. Votes on the live broadcast website directly decide the winner.
: For the first round, six advanced housemates split into two teams to compete, in this round, three housemates will be evicted. According to the votes, Tan Xiangjun and Wang Manyu are the leaders of the two teams. The winning team leader (Team 1) will evict 1 housemate, the losing team (Team 2) will evict 2 housemates. As the leader of Team 1, Wang Manyu chose to evict Han Chenbin. As the leader of Team 2, Tan Xiangjun chose to evict Yang Xiaolou and herself.
: The losing team (Team 2) has a chance to bring back one evicted housemate. If Xie Sitong accepts and passes the special challenge, she will have a chance to bring back one evicted housemate and the winning team will evict 2 housemates.
She accepts and passes the challenge. Yang Xiaolou returned. Then the winning team (Team 1) chose to evict Jiang Chen.
: For the second round, According to the popularity poll, Deng Huanyu with the most votes returned and compete with three advanced housemates from the first round. 
: After that, two housemates will advance into the final round and two housemates will be evicted. Everyone must write two curse cards. The lowest number curse card will choose the task first. Turn the wheel to select the task, pass the task could cancel half number of cards. If the task failed, then add one card to their game point. After all of the tasks are completed, two housemates with the fewest game points will be evicted. If it is a tie, the shortest time to complete the task wins. Wang Manyu and Deng Huanyu with the fewest game points therefore evicted.
: For the final round, according to the internet popularity, Tan Xiangjun returned and compete with two advanced housemates from the second round for the final price. 
: The Most Popular Housemate is Deng Huanyu. His popular value reached to 2,130,013,699,801.
: With the most popular values, Tan Xiangjun is The winner of the pilot season. Her popular value is 429,630.

Votes
All of the "?" Indicating the number was obscured by the host's body.

Vote for the winner
The vote from the final live broadcast website. All housemates took part in this vote. The winner, runner-up, and third place, were decided between the final three remaining housemates.

Round 1
A popular value vote between the six advanced housemates. (Due date:4 Jan.) (Live broadcast website + Weibo)

Round 2
A popular value voting between the first four evicted housemates. (Live broadcast website + Weibo)

According to the popularity poll, the housemate with the most votes will return.

Round 3
A popular value voting between the five housemates. (Live broadcast website + Weibo)

According to the popularity poll, the housemate with the most votes will return.

Game points

Round 1
In two rounds of games, each team must be deducted the number of curse cards they wrote before. These are the final results.

Round 2
Everyone must write two curse cards. The person with the least curse cards will choose the task first.

After all of the tasks completed, the two housemates with the least game points would be evicted.

References

External links 
 Official Site
 Official Weibo
 Youku Channel
 Tudou Channel

China
2010s Chinese television series
Chinese television series based on non-Chinese television series
Chinese game shows
Chinese reality television series